André Chrétien (born 22 February 1907, date of death unknown) was a French modern pentathlete. He competed at the 1936 Summer Olympics.

References

External links
 

1907 births
Year of death missing
French male modern pentathletes
Olympic modern pentathletes of France
Modern pentathletes at the 1936 Summer Olympics